Palgarup is a small town situated between Yornup and Manjimup on the South Western Highway. At the 2021 census, Palgarup had a total population of 145.

Notes and references

South West (Western Australia)

Towns in Western Australia